Mint Bills, formerly Check and before that Pageonce, was a website and mobile banking application developed by Check, Inc.  Mint Bills utilized proprietary account aggregation technology for secure payment technologies in its mobile applications; its primary service allowed users to pay bills and track bank, credit card, investment, and loan transactions and balances through the Mint Bills website or mobile apps for its Android and iOS platforms. Mint Bills was bought by Intuit in 2014 and integrated into Mint.com in March 2017. The Mint.com bill payment service was then discontinued on June 30, 2018.

Check, Inc.
Check, Inc., which developed the original Pageonce program later renamed Check, was founded in May 2007 and had offices in Palo Alto, CA and in Israel. Check raised $1.5M in capital investment from Liron Petrushka and Bobby Lent in January 2008, and a further $6.5M from Pitango Venture Capital in December 2009.

Intuit
In May 2014, Intuit agreed to purchase Check for $360 million; the purchase was expected to occur before July 31, 2014. In December 2014, the transition was completed, and new users installed Mint Bills, while installed Check apps updated automatically to Mint Bills.

In December 2016, Mint began integrating bill tracking payment and functionality into Mint.com and the Mint app. In January 2017, users were notified by email and via notices in their apps that Mint Bills would go away on 26 Mar 2017, and its functionality integrated with Mint. The Mint.com bill payment service was discontinued on June 30, 2018.

References

External links 
 , now redirected to Mint.com
 

Account aggregation providers
Information technology companies of the United States
Companies based in Palo Alto, California